Max Mirnyi and Daniel Nestor were the defending champions and top seeds, and Nestor came into the event as the two-time defending champion.
They successfully defended their title by defeating Bob Bryan and Mike Bryan 6–4, 6–4 in the final.

Seeds

Draw

Finals

Top half

Section 1

Section 2

Bottom half

Section 3

Section 4

References
2012 French Open – Men's draws and results at the International Tennis Federation

Men's Doubles
French Open by year – Men's doubles